The 1976 Amstel Gold Race was the 11th edition of the annual road bicycle race "Amstel Gold Race", held on Sunday March 27, 1976, in the Dutch provinces of Limburg. The race stretched 230 kilometres, with the start in Heerlen and the finish in Meerssen. There were a total of 118 competitors, and 42 cyclists finished the race.

Result

Amstel Gold Race
1976 in road cycling
1976 in Dutch sport
1976 Super Prestige Pernod